Terrace Park is a village in Hamilton County, Ohio, and a wealthy suburb of Greater Cincinnati. The population was 2,355 at the 2020 census.

History

The primary document for the history of Terrace Park is "A Place Called Terrace Park" by Ellis Rawnsley (1992).

Rawnsley notes that the earliest human inhabitants of Terrace Park may have arrived as early as 12,000 years ago—the Paleo-Indians.  Although "no traces of established settlements have ever been found," flints showing evidence of these nomadic people have been found in various locations in the areas surrounding Terrace Park.

Circa approximately 1000 B.C., settlements appeared in Hamilton County, Ohio.

According to Rawnsley, "Two thousand or more years ago, a primitive people built, in what is now Terrace Park, one of the largest of its kind of the 295 prehistoric earthworks ever found in Hamilton County."

Mounds from the Adena culture are found throughout a wide area which contains Terrace Park.

In January 1789, Abraham Covalt established a small fortified settlement called Covalt Station in what is now Terrace Park. The area was surrounded by Shawnee settlements, and the Shawnee were hostile towards the white settlement in their midst. Covalt Station had to be abandoned in 1792 due to continuing attacks by the Shawnee, and white settlers only returned after General "Mad Anthony" Wayne defeated the Native American Western Confederacy at the Battle of Fallen Timbers and secured the Treaty of Greenville which ceded all of southern Ohio (and other territory) to the United States. Before roads and railroads connected the village to other nearby settlements, such as Milford, most residents of Terrace Park kept cattle and chickens, and engaged in other agricultural activities for their own subsistence, and had "homesteads" as opposed to the ordered residential village of today.

Terrace Park was incorporated in 1893.

The John Robinson Circus, founded by John H. Robinson, had its winter home in Terrace Park until 1916.  During the time that the circus wintered in Terrace Park, it was not unusual for elephants to roam free about the village, until the village council asked in 1910 that they be restrained. The famous elephant Tillie was known to walk the streets of Terrace Park, where she is now buried.

Geography
Terrace Park is located at  (39.159911, -84.308192).

Terrace Park feeds into the Mariemont City School District, which includes Mariemont High School.

Demographics

2010 census
As of the census of 2010, there were 2,251 people, 758 households, and 615 families living in the village. The racial makeup of the village was 98.6% White, 0.1% African American, 0.4% Asian, 0.2% from other races, and 0.7% from two or more races. Hispanic or Latino of any race were 0.8% of the population.

There were 758 households, of which 48.9% had children under the age of 18 living with them, 73.6% were married couples living together, 5.3% had a female householder with no husband present, 2.2% had a male householder with no wife present, and 18.9% were non-families. 16.8% of all households were made up of individuals, and 7.9% had someone living alone who was 65 years of age or older. The average household size was 2.97 and the average family size was 3.38.

The median age in the village was 41.4 years. 35% of residents were under the age of 18; 3.7% were between the ages of 18 and 24; 18.6% were from 25 to 44; 32.3% were from 45 to 64; and 10.5% were 65 years of age or older. The gender makeup of the village was 50.2% male and 49.8% female.

2000 census
As of the census of 2000, there were 2,273 people, 760 households, and 646 families living in the village. The population density was 1,889.7 people per square mile (731.3/km). There were 794 housing units at an average density of 660.1 per square mile (255.5/km). The racial makeup of the village was 98.90% White, 0.18% African American, 0.57% Asian, 0.04% from other races, and 0.31% from two or more races. Hispanic or Latino of any race were 0.79% of the population.

There were 760 households, out of which 51.8% had children under the age of 18 living with them, 76.1% were married couples living together, 7.2% had a female householder with no husband present, and 15.0% were non-families. 14.6% of all households were made up of individuals, and 8.7% had someone living alone who was 65 years of age or older. The average household size was 2.99 and the average family size was 3.33.

In the village, the population was spread out, with 35.6% under the age of 18, 3.6% from 18 to 24, 23.8% from 25 to 44, 24.6% from 45 to 64, and 12.4% who were 65 years of age or older. The median age was 39 years. For every 100 females there were 99.9 males. For every 100 females age 18 and over, there were 88.8 males.

The median income for a household in the village was $95,530, and the median income for a family was $104,250. Males had a median income of $72,321 versus $41,500 for females. The per capita income for the village was $42,391. About 1.7% of families and 2.0% of the population were below the poverty line, including 2.7% of those under age 18 and none of those age 65 or over.

Household income
As of 2019, the median household income in the village was $160,000, making Terrace Park the most affluent town in Ohio with a population between 1,000 and 25,000.

Notable people
 Rob Portman, Republican U.S. senator for Ohio (2011-2023)
 John Robinson, famous for founding the John Robinson Circus

Notable animal
 Tillie (elephant)

See also
Terrace Park High School

References

External links
 Village website
 Terrace Park community page
 Terrace Park Historical Society
 Terrace Park Building Survey

Villages in Hamilton County, Ohio
Villages in Ohio
Populated places established in 1893
1893 establishments in Ohio